"Imagine That'" is a song written by Bryan White, Derek George and John Tirro, and recorded by American country music group Diamond Rio.  It was released in November 1997 as the second and final single from their Greatest Hits compilation album.  It peaked at number 4 in both the United States and Canada.

Chart performance

Year-end charts

References

1998 singles
1997 songs
Diamond Rio songs
Songs written by Bryan White
Arista Nashville singles
Songs written by Derek George